Oriental Orthodoxy in Guatemala refers to adherents of Oriental Orthodox Christianity in Guatemala. Most of the Oriental Orthodox Christians in Guatemala are ethnic Maya, who are under ecclesiastical jurisdiction of the Syriac Orthodox Church of Antioch.

History
Emergence of Oriental Orthodoxy in Guatemala was closely related to the process of canonical revival within particular Christian communities. By 2012, first contacts were initiated between the Renewed Ecumenical Catholic Church of Guatemala (ICERGUA) and representatives of Syriac Orthodox Church in North America, and within a year full communion was achieved. Leaders of ICERGUA accepted theological positions of Oriental Orthodox Christianity, and ecclesiastical jurisdiction of Syriac Orthodox Patriarch Ignatius Zakka I Iwas of Antioch. Conversion process was particularly successful among indigenous Maya in Guatemala.

This revival movement was led by Eduardo Aguirre-Oestmann, a former priest of the Roman Catholic Archdiocese of Guatemala. In 2003, Aguirre formed  as a charismatic independent catholic church. In 2006, Cardinal Rodolfo Quezada Toruño, archbishop of the Archdiocese of Guatemala, excommunicated Aguirre and adherents of his group.

When  was collectively received into Syriac Orthodox Church in 2012-2013, it was reorganized as the "Central American Archdiocese of the Syriac Orthodox Catholic Apostolic Church of Antioch" (ICASOAC). As of 2015,  has not published membership figures but includes a 2009 estimate of  membership on its website, which gives figures between 50,000 and 350,000. The Syriac Orthodox Church has announced that membership may be as high as 800,000.

See also 
 Eastern Orthodoxy in Guatemala
 Religion in Guatemala

Notes

References

External links
 Official pages of the Central American Archdiocese of the Syriac Orthodox Church of Antioch

Guatemala
Christian denominations in Guatemala
Oriental Orthodoxy in North America